Daniel Phillips (born 27 January 1971) is an Australian sailor. He competed in the 49er event at the 2000 Summer Olympics.

References

External links
 

1971 births
Living people
Australian male sailors (sport)
Olympic sailors of Australia
Sailors at the 2000 Summer Olympics – 49er
Sailors from Sydney